is a passenger railway station located in the city of Himeji, Hyōgo Prefecture, Japan, operated by the private Sanyo Electric Railway.

Lines

Station layout
The station consists of two unnumbered ground-level side platforms connected by an elevated station building. The station is unattended.

Platforms

Adjacent stations

|-
!colspan=5|Sanyo Electric Railway

History
Shirahamanomiya Station opened on August 19, 1923.

Passenger statistics
In fiscal 2018, the station was used by an average of 3214 passengers daily (boarding passengers only).

Bus connection
Shinki Bus Co., Ltd.
Shirahamanomiya (3 minutes from the station)
for Panasonic Liquid Crystal Display Co., Ltd.
Shirahama-kitanocho (8 minutes from the station)
Route 92 for Himeji Station (South Gates) / for Shirahama Kaigan and Usazaki-minami

Surrounding area
The station is crowded on the days of "Nada Kenka Matsuri" at Matsubara Hachiman Shrine on 14 and 15 October yearly,
Matsubara Hachiman Shrine
Himeji City Hall Shirahama Branch, Himeji City Shirahama Library
Kansai Electric Power Company, Inc. Himeji Daini Power Plant
Osaka Gas Himeji Factory
Panasonic Liquid Crystal Display Co., Ltd. headquarters and factory

See also
List of railway stations in Japan

References

External links

 Official website (Sanyo Electric Railway) 
 Shinki Bus Co., Ltd. 

Railway stations in Japan opened in 1923
Railway stations in Himeji